Lawrence Kenneth "Larry" Pennell (February 21, 1928 – August 28, 2013) was an American television and film actor, often remembered for his role as "Dash Riprock" in the television series The Beverly Hillbillies. His career spanned half a century, including starring in the first-run syndicated adventure series Ripcord in the leading role of Skydiver Theodore "Ted" McKeever, as well as playing Keith Holden in Lassie. He was also a baseball player, playing on scholarship for the University of Southern California (USC) and later professionally for the Boston Braves organization.

Early life and education
Pennell was born in Uniontown, Pennsylvania to entrepreneur Harold Pennell and homemaker Ruth Pennell. His parents moved to Niagara Falls, New York during the Great Depression in search of better opportunities. After a short time in New York, the family moved to California. They lived in a studio apartment overlooking Angels Flight in Downtown Los Angeles. His family moved again when he was still young, purchasing a home near Paramount Studios in Hollywood. He became a newsboy on the studio lot, but athletics distracted him from any early interest in film.

Pennell played baseball throughout his youth. He attended Hollywood High School, at which he played first base and was later inducted into the school's athletic hall of fame. He was recruited by Rod Dedeaux to play baseball at USC, where he began playing in 1947. Pennell attended the university on a full baseball scholarship and became one of the school's all-time letter winners. He left school early to play professionally for the Boston Braves organization, from 1948 to 1953.

Baseball career

Just shy of graduating from USC, Pennell left the university to play professionally for the Boston Braves. During his time with the Braves, his teammates often referred to him as "Bud", a nickname that stuck with him throughout his life. He was with the organization for a total of seven seasons between 1948 and 1954, playing first base and outfield for the Evansville Braves, Boston's minor league affiliate.

In his first year in professional ball, he broke the Appalachian League record for runs batted in with 147 and hit .338 for the season while belting 18 home runs. He was portrayed in Hall of Famer, Eddie Mathews' autobiography, as a "fun-loving teammate." He did not play during the 1950–1953 seasons due to his service during the Korean War. He served in counter intelligence in the United States Army and received an honorable discharge upon completion of his service. Upon his return home, his baseball contract was purchased by the Brooklyn Dodgers. Pennell never reported to spring training for the Dodgers and instead decided to pursue acting, a career he had dabbled in during the off seasons. Regarding his retirement from baseball, sportswriter Furman Bisher was quoted as saying "his future seemed unlimited...I shall always be frustrated by a desire to know how great a star he might have become."

Acting career

In the baseball off-seasons, Pennell returned home to Hollywood. Shortly after his contract was purchased by the Brooklyn organization, he decided not to report to spring training and instead began his career in films. After being seen by a talent scout, Pennell got a screen test at Paramount Pictures where he went under contract. Then he traveled to New York City to learn his new craft from drama icons such as Sanford Meisner and Stella Adler.

It was in 1955 when Pennell's acting career was launched. He appeared in his first role as Oliver Brown in the movie Seven Angry Men, a film about abolitionist John Brown, starring Raymond Massey. That role led him to a lead in Hell's Horizon, which was followed by The Far Horizons, starred Charlton Heston and Donna Reed. His next film role was as George Crandall opposite James Stewart in The FBI Story.

Other roles followed, including the leading role as Johnny Jargin in the car racing adventure movie The Devil's Hairpin. Early in his acting career, Pennell went to Europe to appear in films, including Old Surehand, a German production based upon a Karl May's novel. In European films he was occasionally credited as Alessandro Pennelli. He returned to the United States and made guest appearances in several western television series such as Dick Powell's Zane Grey Theater, Death Valley Days, Have Gun – Will Travel, Wagon Train, Bat Masterson, The Big Valley, The Virginian, Gunsmoke, Bonanza, Rango, Custer, Branded, The Rough Riders, Cimarron City and Tombstone Territory. 

In 1961, he landed the leading role on the television series Ripcord as the handsome skydiver Theodore (Ted) McKeever. His co-star was Ken Curtis, later as Festus Haggin on Gunsmoke, as his inseparable, level-headed older mentor and best buddy James (Jim) Buckley. Ripcord ran for a total of 76 half-hour episodes between 1961 and 1963 and inspired a range of tie-in merchandise such as toy parachutes, action figures, board games, clean slates, reading books, comic books and coloring books, to name a few. More television guest appearances followed on The Outer Limits, Thriller, The Millionaire, The West Point Story, Wire Service, The Case of the Dangerous Robin, Steve Canyon, Sea Hunt, The Aquanauts, The Everglades, Adventures in Paradise, Dragnet, and Suspense Theater.

As Dash Riprock on The Beverly Hillbillies, he appeared in ten episodes as a film star courting Elly May Clampett (Donna Douglas). After The Beverly Hillbillies, Pennell guest starred in other television series like Blue Light; My Friend Tony; Mayberry, R.F.D.; Family Affair; Land of the Giants; Bracken's World; BJ and the Bear and Salvage 1.

Pennell travelled to Europe in 1965 where he starred in two films, the Eurospy Our Man in Jamaica and the Sauerkraut Western Old Surehand.

Throughout his career, Pennell continued to appear in a variety of genres in television series and movies made for television. He was cast in a lead role as Keith Holden in 1972 in the CBS series Lassie. He made guest starring appearances in various shows, including Mannix; Longstreet; Hunter; Banacek; Mission: Impossible; The Streets of San Francisco; McMillan and Wife; Magnum, P.I.; The Rookies; Little House on the Prairie; Owen Marshall: Counselor at Law; O'Hara, U.S. Treasury; Run, Joe, Run; Apple's Way; Silk Stalkings; Diagnosis Murder; Quantum Leap and Firefly and soap operas such as General Hospital and The Young and the Restless.

Pennell's film credits include roles in films such as The Great White Hope (1970), starring James Earl Jones and Jane Alexander in which Pennell played former heavyweight champion Frank Brady. Pennell also appeared in the big budget World War II film Midway (1976), as Captain Cyril Simard, alongside Charlton Heston and Henry Fonda. He had roles in other major films such as The Revengers, Journey Through Rosebud and Matilda.  Pennell bore a striking resemblance to Clark Gable and played the icon in three roles. One of his notable roles as Gable was in the television film Marilyn: The Untold Story (1980). It was said of his work in that role "Pennell's performance is a little gem." In 1992, Pennell and Tom Selleck rejoined for a third time to appear in Mr. Baseball. Other films include The Fear (1999), Bubba Ho-Tep (2002) starring Ossie Davis, Five Minutes (2002), Last Confession (2005), Seasons of Life (2006) and The Passing (2011).

Pennell continued to experiment with his acting and writing craft in study with drama masters such as Milton Katselis and Daniel Mann. Pennell's stage work encompassed over 50 plays, including The Poker Game, Desperate Hours, Pieces of Time and Dead Autumn's Soul. He wrote and starred in The Signing and Close-Up and won best actor at The Method Fest 2002 for his work in the short film Five Minutes. Throughout his career, Pennell accumulated over 400 credits in roles across stage, film and television, in addition to commercials and print advertisements.

Filmography

Selected film credits

Selected television credits

Selected theater credits
 Dream a Little Dream – Lead – Company of Angels, Los Angeles
 Sing the Song Lady – Lead – Network Studio, North Hollywood
 Monroe – Lead – Crystal Sands, Hilton Head, South Carolina
 The Signing (written by Larry Pennell) – Lead – Stella Adler Theater, Beverly Hills Playhouse

 Close-Up (written by Larry Pennell) – Lead – Stella Adler Theater, Beverly Hills Playhouse
 Pieces of time – Lead – Pan Andreas Theater, Hollywood
 Desperate Hours – Lead – New Dramatist's, Inc., New York City
 Dead Autumn's Soul – Lead – New York City
 The Poker Game – Lead – (Pre-Broadway) New York City
 Mary, Mary – Lead – Tiffany's Attic Theater, Kansas City

Personal life
Pennell met his wife Patricia Throop, a fashion model, actress, former Miss Oregon and finalist in the 1954 Miss America Pageant. He was shooting a film when they met. Throughout his life he enjoyed sports of all kinds such as baseball, football, tennis, boxing, running and horseback riding. Also he was an avid historian and a patriot with ancestral links in the American Revolution and the Mayflower Compact. Pennell died on August 28, 2013 at age 85.

References

External links
 

1928 births
2013 deaths
American male film actors
Male Western (genre) film actors
American male television actors
Place of death missing
Baseball players from Pennsylvania
Male actors from Pittsburgh
20th-century American male actors
21st-century American male actors
People from Uniontown, Pennsylvania
Evansville Braves players
USC Trojans baseball players